Events in the year 2021 in the Federated States of Micronesia.

Incumbents
President: David W. Panuelo
Vice President: Yosiwo George

Events
Ongoing — COVID-19 pandemic in Oceania

Scheduled events 
2 March – Scheduled date for the 2021 Micronesian parliamentary election.

Deaths

References

 
2020s in the Federated States of Micronesia
Years of the 21st century in the Federated States of Micronesia
Micronesia
Micronesia